Callimetopus cynthia is a species of beetle in the family Cerambycidae. It was described by James Thomson in 1865, originally under the genus Euclea. It is known from the Philippines.

References

Callimetopus
Beetles described in 1865